The Bengal Times  a newspaper published from Dhaka. It was the second newspaper of its kind published in 1871. E. C. Kemp was the editor. The Bengal Times was a very influential newspaper in East Bengal. it was modern in format, type and in presenting news. The magazine, which was published every Wednesday and Saturday, used to be printed in four columns. It used to contain extracts from different magazines, letters from London and Paris, some articles, brief news from Dhaka and other areas. Occasionally, poems were also published

References 

Defunct newspapers published in Bangladesh
1856 establishments in India